Cosmopol is a shopping mall in Coacalco de Berriozábal, State of Mexico, in the metropolitan area of Mexico City, along . The mall was opened in September 2015. It is anchored by Liverpool and Sears, and it has over 210 stores and services and 2,900 parking lots.

History and construction

For the construction of the shopping center, a  site was used. The space is located at  #1, in the municipality of Coacalco de Berriozábal, in the State of Mexico, north of Mexico City. It has three levels and two basement levels for parking, plus an external parking lot behind the center. Inside the shopping center, there are two sculptures, one by Sebastián and the other by Tere Metta.

The area is serviced by the State of Mexico's Mexibús, a bus rapid transit system, at Coacalco Berriozábal station. There is a residential center named Cosmopol Lifestyle behind the shopping center.

Incidents
During the afternoon of 20 July 2017, a group of people went on a shooting spree at an iShopMixup storeand they stole multiple electronic devices. On the night of 11 September 2017, a group of people robbed the jewelry store Bizarro. On 2 February 2022, two people robbed the Sanborns store and stole cell phones.

Gallery

References

External links
 
 

2015 establishments in Mexico
Coacalco de Berriozábal
Shopping malls established in 2015
Shopping malls in Greater Mexico City